Charles C. Jordan (born January 31, 1954) is an American former professional basketball player. He played for one season in the American Basketball Association for the Indiana Pacers. He then spent the remainder of his career playing in international leagues, including stops in France and Italy.

Jordan did not get to play his senior year at Canisius because the NCAA declared both he and Larry Fogle ineligible for having received "improper financial aid" sometime during his career at the school.

Jordan's younger brother, C.J., played college basketball for the Louisiana Ragin' Cajuns.

References

1954 births
Living people
American expatriate basketball people in France
American expatriate basketball people in Italy
American men's basketball players
ASVEL Basket players
Basketball players from Indianapolis
Canisius Golden Griffins men's basketball players
Fortitudo Pallacanestro Bologna players
Indiana Pacers draft picks
Indiana Pacers players
Lega Basket Serie A players
Small forwards
Shortridge High School alumni